Stoliczkia khasiensis (common names: Khasi earth snake, Khase red snake) is a species of snake in the family Xenodermidae. It is endemic to Meghalaya (until 1972 part of Assam), Northeast India. The type locality is Khasi Hills.

While it is only known from few specimens (18, as of 2011), it is considered locally abundant in Sarawak. It occurs in several protected areas (e.g., Crocker Range National Park,  Bukit Baka Bukit Raya National Park), and there are no major threats to this species.

References

Xenodermidae
Reptiles of India
Endemic fauna of India
Reptiles described in 1870
Taxa named by Thomas C. Jerdon